Labour Party leadership elections were held in the following countries in 1922:

1922 Labour Party leadership election (UK)
1922 New Zealand Labour Party leadership election